Efrem Zimbalist Winters (born December 19, 1963) is an American former collegiate basketball player. At a height of 6'9" (2.05 m) tall, he played at the Power Forward position.

High school
A native of Chicago, Illinois, Winters attended King High School from 1978 to 1982. After completing high school, Winters was named a Parade Magazine All-American, and additionally named to the West squad of the 1982 McDonald's All-American Team. At the conclusion of the game, Winters had scored 19 points and was named the Most Valuable Player (MVP).

College career
Winters was recruited to play college basketball at the University of Illinois at Urbana–Champaign after high school and was a member of the varsity basketball team from 1982 to 1986. He played in 129 of 130 games during his four years at Illinois, missing only one game during his freshman year. Winters was the starting power forward for all four seasons, replacing Bryan Leonard in the third game of the 1982-83 season. During his freshman season, Winters played alongside future NBA great Derek Harper as well as Illinois' all-time leader in steals and assists, guard Bruce Douglas, freshman guard Doug Altenberger, freshman forward Scott Meents, sophomore forward George Montgomery and sophomore forward Anthony Welch to form the nucleus for a team that would advance to the NCAA tournament every year.  Winters started all four years at Illinois and made an immediate impact, setting freshman school records for scoring, rebounding and games started.  Winters finished the season as the team leader in rebounds and blocked shots while finishing second to Harper in scoring. The Illini finished the season with an overall record of 21–11 and a conference record of 11–7, fourth place in the Big Ten Conference and a berth in the 1983 NCAA Division I men's basketball tournament. Winters' Illini team was a #7 seed and placed in the West Region, where they lost in the first round to Utah.

As a sophomore during the 1983-84 season, Winters enjoyed the most successful season as a member of the Fighting Illini. Individually, Winters led the team in scoring while being second in blocked shots and rebounding to teammate George Montgomery. The team finished ranked #6 in the nation with an overall record of 26–5 and a Big Ten record of 15–3, which placed them in a tie for the conference championship with tenth-ranked Purdue. After the end of the regular season, Illinois advanced to the NCAA tournament, playing in the Mideast Regional. The Illini defeated Rollie Massimino and the Villanova Wildcats in the second round to earn a berth in the "Sweet-Sixteen" where they would also defeat Lefty Driesell and the Maryland Terrapins. This win advanced Illinois to the NCAA Regional Finals and a game versus Kentucky. The Illini had two negatives going against them even before the game would be played, the first being that the game was to be played at Rupp Arena (Kentucky's home court), and the second was that Winters had sprained his ankle during the game against Maryland and was not at full strength. The Illini fought hard throughout the game. However, they would eventually succumb and lose 54 to 51. This loss to Kentucky on their home court would cause the NCAA to put a rule in place not allowing a school to play in a tournament game on its home court. At the conclusion of the season, Winters was named to the Big Ten's all-conference first team.  However, Winters was never quite as effective after the injury.

In his junior season of 1984–85, the Fighting Illini started the season with 11 wins and only 2 losses prior to the Big Ten opener against Minnesota, reaching an overall ranking of #4 in the nation. However, the team would falter and lose its next two games, dropping them in the conference standings and a national ranking of #15 in the nation. Winters, on the other hand, would not be able to recreate the same magical sophomore season results, finishing third on the team in scoring, but first in blocked shots and rebounding. The Illini would finish the season 26-9 overall and 12-6 in the conference, second to Michigan. After the season, Winters was named third team All-Big Ten and was also dubbed a team captain for his senior season. The Illini would once again garner a berth in the NCAA tournament, this time placed in the East Regional as a #3 seed. The Illini would defeat Jim Calhoun and the Northeastern Huskies in the first round and the Georgia Bulldogs in the second round, setting up a showdown with Bobby Cremins and the Georgia Tech Yellow Jackets in the East Regional Semi-Final. Georgia Tech, behind the efforts of Mark Price and John Salley would prevail, knocking Winters and the Fighting Illini out of the tournament in the "Sweet-Sixteen".

During Winter's senior season, the Illini continued their winning ways for 1985-86 by winning 10 of their first 12 games, including the Braggin' Rights game played against Missouri. Overall Illinois would finish the season with its fourth consecutive 20+ winning campaign by holding a 22 and 10 record while finishing fourth in the Big Ten with a 11 and 7 record, losing twice to Bob Knight and the Indiana Hoosiers. During the season the team would win the Illini Classic and finish the year with an AP ranking of number 19. Winters and the Illini would gain a fourth consecutive bid to the NCAA tournament, receiving a #4 seed in the Southeast Regional. After defeating Fairfield in the first round, the Illini would lose to Wimp Sanderson and the Alabama Crimson Tide in the second round. After the season, Winters would be named honorable mention All-Big Ten while finishing third on the team in scoring and blocked shots and second on the team in rebounding behind Ken Norman. During his playing time at Illinois, Winters' teams would win 95 of 130 games, winning 73% of the time and make the NCAA tournament each year.

Winters finished his Illinois career as the school's all-time rebounding leader with 853 rebounds (since eclipsed and now holds third) and #3 all-time scorer.  He started 120 games in his Illinois career, a school record not surpassed until 2002 by Cory Bradford.  Winters helped to start Illinois' nearly annual appearance in the NCAA Tournament.  The Douglas-to-Winters alley-oop became a staple play of the Illinois offense.  For his position and height, Winters was a superb free throw shooter; his name appears several times in the school record book for accuracy from the foul line.

Winters was invited to tryouts for the United States men's national basketball team in preparation for the 1984 Summer Olympics.  However, he did not make the first cut when the field was reduced to 32 players by head coach Bobby Knight and his selection committee.

NBA draft
Winters was drafted by the Atlanta Hawks in the 1986 NBA draft during the 4th round as the 88th pick overall. However, he was cut by the Hawks and never played in the NBA. Winters attempted to play in the French Basketball League, but he was released and returned to Chicago.  He now works for a construction company.

Honors

High school
 Parade Magazine All-American (1982)
 McDonald's All-American (1982)
 Inducted into the Illinois Basketball Coaches Association's Hall of Fame as a player. (1997)

College
 First-team All-Big Ten (1984)
 Playboy Pre-Season All-American (1985)
 Third-team All-Big Ten (1985)
 Team Captain (1986)
 Playboy Pre-Season All-American (1985)
 Honorable mention All-Big Ten (1986)

College statistics

References

1963 births
Living people
African-American basketball players
American men's basketball players
Atlanta Hawks draft picks
Basketball players from Chicago
Forwards (basketball)
Illinois Fighting Illini men's basketball players
McDonald's High School All-Americans
Parade High School All-Americans (boys' basketball)
21st-century African-American people
20th-century African-American sportspeople